
The following lists events that happened during 1829 in South Africa.

Events
 1 October – South African College founded in Cape Town, South Africa; later to separate into the South African College Schools and the University of Cape Town.

References
See Years in South Africa for list of References

 
South Africa
Years in South Africa